Fashu Poshteh (also Romanized as Fashū Poshteh) is a village in Shirju Posht Rural District, Rudboneh District, Lahijan County, Gilan Province, Iran. At the 2006 census, its population was 233, in 75 families.

References 

Populated places in Lahijan County